Julius Otto Grimm (6 March 1827 in Pernau, Livonia, now Pärnu, Estonia – 7 December 1903 in Münster) was a  German composer, conductor and musician of Westphalia.  He is best remembered today as one of the best friends of Johannes Brahms, whom he met in Leipzig in 1853. Brahms dedicated his 4 Ballades, Op 10, to him.

Life

After studying philology and philosophy at the University of Tartu (then the University of Dorpat), concluding his exams in 1848, he began his career and avocation as tutor in Saint Petersburg.
At this time he began publishing his first compositions. He also pursued further studies in Dresden from 1851/2.

In 1855, he took an appointment as Professor of Music and Choral Conductor in Göttingen.  Five years later, in 1860 he accepted the post of conductor of the Musikverein (Music Association) of Münster. During his 40 years of activity in Münster he received many honors and appointments. He received an honorary doctorate in 1897.

At his death among his papers were found "hundreds of letters from Madame Schumann, Brahms and Dr. Joachim", several of Brahms' manuscripts (presumably) given as gifts, including that of the piano sonata no. 1 op. 1, a song from op. 3, and Brahms' Missa Canonica, an unfinished mass material from which went into the motets op. 74 (and which has been recorded).

His compositions include a violin sonata in A major, three suites, and a symphony in D minor, his opus 19, published in 1875. One of Grimm's suites, his opus 10 in canon form, is given a positive mention and described in some detail in a review (of a performance by the Boston Symphony under Theodore Thomas, in March 1869) in John Sullivan Dwight's journal.

Works

Orchestral
Orchestral Suite No. 1 in the Form of a Canon, Op. 10
Orchestral Suite No. 2 in the Form of a Canon, Op. 16
Two Marches, Op. 17
Symphony in D minor, Op. 19
1. Sostenuto - allegro
2. Trauermarsch: andante
3. Scherzo: presto
4. Finale: allegro vivace
Orchestral Suite No. 3, Op. 25

Chamber music
Violin Sonata in A major, Op. 14

Piano Music
Five Piano Pieces, Op. 2
Three Elegies, Op. 6
Two Scherzos for Four-Hand Piano
Four Piano Pieces in freier canonischer Weise

Choral Music
An die Musik for Soloists, Choir, and Orchestra, Op. 12
Kaiserhymne for Male Choir and Orchstra, Op. 21
Zum Geburtsfeste des Kaisers for Male Choir and Wind Orchestra, Op. 27
Abendfeier
Frühlingslied

Lieder
Sechs Lieder, Op. 1
Sechs Lieder, Op. 3
Sechs Lieder, Op. 11
Sechs Lieder, Op. 15
Deutsche Volkslieder

References

External links
 

1827 births
1903 deaths
People from Pärnu
People from Kreis Pernau
Baltic-German people
German Romantic composers
German male conductors (music)
German male classical composers
19th-century German musicians
20th-century German conductors (music)
20th-century German male musicians
19th-century German male musicians
University of Tartu alumni
Academic staff of the University of Göttingen